Dundas is an unincorporated community in Vinton County, in the U.S. state of Ohio. It is located near the junction of State Route 324 and State Route 93.

History
Dundas was established in 1857 as McArthur Junction when the B&O railroad was extended to that point. A post office called Dundas was established in 1856 and remained in operation until 1983. Many houses from Oreton, Ohio were moved to Dundas in the 1950s.

References

Unincorporated communities in Vinton County, Ohio
1857 establishments in Ohio
Populated places established in 1857
Unincorporated communities in Ohio